The 2012 Men's Central American and Caribbean Basketball Championship, also known as 2012 Centrobasket, was the regional championship of FIBA Americas for Central America and Caribbean subzone, played June 18–24, 2012. The top four teams qualified for the 2013 FIBA Americas Championship.

Participating teams
From the 2011 CBC Championship:

From Central America:

Participants from 2011 FIBA Americas Championship:

Preliminary round

Group A

|}

Group B

|}

Knockout round

Semifinals

Third place playoff

Finals

Final ranking

Suspension of Panama
In 2013, FIBA suspended the Panamanian Basketball Federation "for many problems that Panama has been going through for several years due to conflicts of interest between two Directives that manifest hold the same authority," as announced by FIBA Secretary-General Patrick Baumann. This means Panama's "national teams and clubs and referees, cannot participate in any international competition."

References

Centrobasket
2011–12 in North American basketball
2012 in Central American sport
2012 in Caribbean sport
2012 in Puerto Rican sports
International basketball competitions hosted by Puerto Rico
Sports in San Juan, Puerto Rico